The Manoir de Vrigné is a historic manor in Juigné-sur-Sarthe, Sarthe, France.

History
The manor was built from 1493 to 1528 for Pierre Jarry, a member of the Court of Audit under King René of Anjou. It was acquired by Georges Le Clerc de Juigné in 1654.

It is owned by Jean de Durfort. He restored it from 1995 to 2012. In 2012, it was open to visitors during the European Heritage Days.

Architectural significance
It has been listed as an official historical monument by the French Ministry of Culture since 1989.

References

Châteaux in Sarthe
Monuments historiques of Pays de la Loire